Larry Collins Stutts (born May 1954) is a member of the Alabama State Senate. He represents the 6th district, which includes Colbert, Franklin, and parts of Marion, Lawrence, and Lauderdale Counties. He was first elected in 2014, beating incumbent Roger Bedford Jr.

Biography
Before entering politics, Stutts graduated veterinary school in 1979 and moved to Columbus, Georgia to practice. He soon moved back to his hometown of Cherokee, Alabama. He later graduated from the College of Medicine at the University of South Alabama and began to practice obstetrics and gynecology. He has delivered over ten thousand babies.

Political career
Stutts, a Republican, campaigned against incumbent Senator Roger Bedford, a Democrat, on a platform to repeal "Obamacare-style" regulations in Alabama. Following a recount, Stutts won by a margin of about 70 votes.

In 2015, Senator Stutts introduced a bill to repeal two laws.  The first relating to notifying patients of dense breast tissue following a mammogram and the second requiring insurance companies to provide mandatory minimum hospitalization time following a woman giving birth, 48 hours for vaginal delivery and 96 hours for cesarean section. This second law, commonly referred to as Rose's Law, was unanimously passed by the Alabama Legislature following the 1998 death of Rose Church ten days after she had given birth while attended by Stutts.  The attempted appeal of Rose's Law made national news following disclosure that Church had been Stutts' patient at the time of her death.  Senator Stutts withdrew the bill from consideration stating "neither the bill nor today's decision is related to any patient case I have had during my medical career."

In May 2019, he voted to make abortion a crime at any stage in a pregnancy, with no exemptions for cases of rape or incest.

References

External links
 
 Profile, legislature.state.al.us; accessed February 6, 2017.

1954 births
Living people
Republican Party Alabama state senators
People from Sheffield, Alabama
21st-century American politicians
University of South Alabama alumni
Physicians from Alabama
20th-century American physicians
21st-century American physicians